Yazid ibn Abd al-Malik (— 28 January 724), also referred to as Yazid II, was the ninth Umayyad caliph, ruling from 9 February 720 until his death in 724. Although he lacked administrative or military experience, he derived prestige from his lineage, being a descendant of both ruling branches of the Umayyad dynasty, the Sufyanids who founded the Umayyad Caliphate in 661 and the Marwanids who succeeded them in 684. He was designated by his half-brother, Caliph Sulayman ibn Abd al-Malik, as second-in-line to the succession after their cousin Umar II, as a compromise with the sons of Abd al-Malik. 

Yazid's moves were in line with the desires of the Arab militarist camp and the Umayyad dynasty, but did not solve the fiscal crisis of the Caliphate as war booty had become insufficient and the reimposition of the jizya met strong resistance from the converted populations in the large provinces of Khurasan and Ifriqiya.

Yazid reintroduced Syrian troops to enforce Umayyad rule in Iraq, where their domination was long resented. One of the first events of his reign was the wide-scale rebellion of the Iraqis under Yazid ibn al-Muhallab, whose suppression marked the end to the serious anti-Umayyad revolts in the restive province. Ibn al-Muhallab was a champion of the Yamanis and Yazid's appointment of Qaysi partisans to rule Iraq escalated the factional tensions there, though elsewhere Yazid balanced the interests of the two rival factions. The deadly suppression of the Muhallabids became a rallying cry for revenge during the Abbasid Revolution, which toppled the Umayyads in 750.

Early life
Yazid was born in Damascus, the center of the Umayyad Caliphate, . He was the son of Caliph Abd al-Malik and his influential wife Atika, the daughter of Yazid II's namesake, Caliph Yazid I. Yazid II's pedigree united his father's Marwanid branch of the Umayyad dynasty, in power since 684, and the Sufyanid branch of Yazid I and the latter's father Mu'awiya I, founder of the Umayyad Caliphate. 

Yazid did not possess military or administrative experience before his reign. He rarely left Syria except for a number of visits to the Hejaz (western Arabia, home of the Islamic holy cities Mecca and Medina), including once for the annual Hajj pilgrimage sometime between 715 and 717. 

Yazid was possibly granted control of the region around Amman by Abd al-Malik. He built the desert palaces of al-Qastal and al-Muwaqqar, both in the general vicinity of Amman. The palaces are conventionally dated to his caliphate, though a number of archaeologists suggest Yazid began their construction before 720.

Family

Yazid established marital ties to the family of al-Hajjaj ibn Yusuf (d. 714), the powerful viceroy of Iraq for his father and brother, Caliph al-Walid I. He married the al-Hajjaj's niece, Umm al-Hajjaj, the daughter of Muhammad ibn Yusuf al-Thaqafi. During the lifetime of al-Hajjaj, she gave birth to Yazid's sons al-Hajjaj, who died young, and al-Walid II, who became caliph in 743. Yazid was also married to Su'da bint Abd Allah ibn Amr, a great-granddaughter of Caliph Uthman, who mothered Yazid's son and daughter Abd Allah and A'isha. Yazid's other sons were al-Nu'man, Yahya, Muhammad, al-Ghamr, Sulayman, Abd al-Jabbar, Dawud, Abu Sulayman, al-Awwam and Hashim. Yazid's  (patronymic) was Abu Khalid and he was nicknamed  (the Youth).

An anecdote told of Yazid is that his wife Su'da learning he was pining for an expensive slave girl, purchased this slave girl and presented her to Yazid as a gift. This woman's name was Hababah and she predeceased Yazid. It is said that, while feasting with Hababah, Yazid threw a grape into her mouth, on which she choked and died in his arms. Yazid died the next week.

Reign

Accession
By dint of his descent, Yazid was a natural candidate for the succession to the caliphate. A noble Arab maternal lineage held political weight during this period in the Caliphate's history, and Yazid took pride in his maternal Sufyanid descent, viewing himself superior to his Marwanid brothers. He was chosen by his paternal half-brother, Caliph Sulayman, as the second-in-line for the caliphate after their first cousin, Umar II, who ruled from 717 to 720. Yazid acceded at the age of 29 following the death of Umar II on 9 February 720. For much of his reign, he resided in Damascus or his estates in Jund al-Urdunn (the military district of Jordan), which was centered in Tiberias and roughly corresponded with the Byzantine province of Palaestina Secunda.

Suppression of the Muhallabids

Shortly before or immediately after Yazid's accession, the veteran commander and disgraced governor of Iraq and the vast eastern province of Khurasan, Yazid ibn al-Muhallab, escaped from the fortress of Aleppo where Umar II had him imprisoned. During Sulayman's reign, Ibn al-Muhallab, an enemy of al-Hajjaj, had been responsible for the torture and deaths of members of al-Hajjaj's family, Yazid's in-laws, and feared retaliatory maltreatment when Yazid's accession became apparent. Yazid had long held suspicions, nurtured by al-Hajjaj, of Ibn al-Muhallab's and the Muhallabid family's influence and ambitions in Iraq and the eastern Caliphate. 

Evading the pursuit of Umar's or Yazid's commanders, Ibn al-Muhallab made his way to Basra, one of the main garrison towns of Iraq and the center of his family and Azd Uman tribe. On Yazid's orders Basra's governor Adi ibn Artat al-Fazari arrested many of Ibn al-Muhallab's brothers and cousins before his arrival to the city. Ibn Artat was unable to stop Ibn al-Muhallab's entry and the latter, with support from his Yamani tribal allies in the Basra garrison, besieged Ibn Artat in the city's citadel. The Qays–Mudar factions of the garrison, though traditional rivals of the Yaman and unsympathetic to Ibn al-Muhallab, did not actively or effectively oppose him. Ibn al-Muhallab seized the citadel, captured the governor and established control over Basra. Yazid pardoned him, but Ibn al-Muhallab continued his opposition, declaring a holy war (jihād) against the caliph and the Syrian troops who effectively served as the enforcers of Umayyad authority in Iraq. Umar II had likely withdrawn most of the Syrians from Wasit, their main Iraqi garrison, and Ibn al-Muhallab was able to capture the city with relative ease. Most of the pious Qur'an readers and the mawālī (non-Arab Muslim converts) of Basra supported Ibn al-Muhallab's cause, with the exception of the prominent scholar al-Hasan al-Basri. The dependent districts of Basra, namely Ahwaz, Fars and Kerman, joined the revolt, though not Khurasan, where Qays–Mudar troops counterbalanced the pro-Muhallabid Yamani faction in the province's garrisons. 

Ibn al-Muhallab advanced toward Kufa, the other main garrison center of Iraq, where he attracted support across the tribal spectrum and among many of its noble Arab households. In the meantime, Yazid dispatched his kinsmen, the veteran commanders Maslama ibn Abd al-Malik and al-Abbas ibn al-Walid, to suppress the revolt. They killed Ibn al-Muhallab and routed his army near Kufa on 24 August 720. Yazid ordered the executions of the roughly two hundred prisoners-of-war captured from Ibn al-Muhallab's camp, while Ibn al-Muhallab's son Mu'awiya ordered the execution of Ibn Artat and his thirty supporters incarcerated in Wasit. Afterward, the Umayyad authorities pursued and killed many of the Muhallabids, including nine to fourteen boys who were sent to Yazid and executed by his order. The Muhallabid revolt's suppression marked the last of the great anti-Umayyad uprisings in Iraq.

Escalation of Qays–Yaman factionalism

The defeat of the Muhallabids and the successive appointments to the governorship of Iraq of Maslama—who was shortly dismissed for not forwarding the provincial tax surplus to the caliph's treasury—and Maslama's lieutenant, Umar ibn Hubayra al-Fazari, by Yazid signaled a triumph for the Qays–Mudar faction in the province and its eastern dependencies. According to the historian Julius Wellhausen, "the proscription of the whole of the prominent and powerful [Muhallabid] family, a measure hitherto unheard of in the history of the Umaiyids [sic], came like a declaration of war against the Yemen [faction] in general, and the corollary was that the government was degenerating into a Qaisite party-rule". Wellhausen blames the caliph for the escalation of factionalism and attributed the appointment of Ibn Hubayra to his own desire for revenge against the Muhallabids' Yamani backers. The Yamani-affiliated tribes of Khurasan viewed the events as a humiliation and during the Abbasid Revolution which toppled the Umayyads in 750 they adopted as one of their slogans "revenge for the Banu Muhallab [Muhallabids]". 

The orientalist Henri Lammens considers Yazid's portrayal as "a pro-Mudar and anti-Yaman extremist" as "unfair, as he actually tried to balance the conflicting groups, just as other Umayyad rulers did". Yazid did not champion the Qays over the Quda'a, the major component of the Yaman confederation in Syria. Indeed, members of the Quda'a's principal tribe, the Banu Kalb, had formed the core of the caliph's army during the suppression, pursuit and elimination of the Muhallabids. He appointed Yamani governors to the large provinces of Ifriqiya (central North Africa) and the Jazira (Upper Mesopotamia) and its dependent districts of Adharbayjan and Armenia.

Fiscal and military policies
The expenses of enforcing Umayyad rule in Iraq and the expansionist war efforts along multiple fronts, including the enormous cost of the failed sieges of Constantinople in 717–718, had erased much of the monetary gains from the conquests of Transoxiana, Sind and the Iberian Peninsula under al-Walid I and caused a financial crisis in the Caliphate. Among the solutions of Yazid's predecessor to the fiscal burden were the withdrawal of the Syrians from Iraq, a halt on conquests and near elimination of grants to Umayyad princes, as well as an unrealized goal to withdraw Arab troops altogether from Transoxiana, the Iberian Peninsula and Cilicia. The most significant reforms of Umar II granted equality to the mawālī in Khurasan, Sind, Ifriqiya and the Iberian Peninsula by abolishing the jizya, the poll tax traditionally exacted on non-Muslim subjects but in practice extended to non-Arab Muslim converts, and instituting equal pay for mawālī in the ranks of the Caliphate's Arab-dominated armies. According to Blankinship, the reforms favoring the mawālī may have been guided by Umar II's piety, but also a fiscal consideration: if equal treatment with the Arabs made the government popular with the mawālī it could translate into delegating an increased security role for the mawālī in their native provinces and their enthusiastic defense of the Caliphate's frontiers, thereby reducing the expense of deploying and garrisoning Arab troops.

Yazid attempted to reverse, with limited success, the reforms of Umar II, which were opposed by the Arab militarist camp in the Caliphate and the Umayyad ruling family. During Umar II's rule the militarist camp led by Maslama may have accepted a temporary pause in activity to recover from the Constantinople debacle. Under Yazid, Maslama and his proteges, including Ibn Hubayra, were restored or appointed to senior commands, Syrian garrisons were reintroduced to Iraq, the traditional annual raids against the Byzantines and the war with the Khazars were restarted, and the grants of estates or generous sums to Umayyad princes resumed. Although Yazid's policies were presumably meant to gain the backing of the ruling elite and restore the flow of war spoils, they proved insufficient to finance the Caliphate's troops, particularly as booty had become increasingly difficult to obtain by the Arab expeditionary forces.

To fill the depleted coffers of the caliphal treasury Yazid turned to the fifth of provincial tax revenues officially owed to the caliph. Historically, the provinces neglected to forward the revenues if political conditions allowed and governors often pilfered such funds. To ensure the flow of revenues to the treasury, Yazid appointed governors based on the example set by al-Hajjaj, i.e. upright, meticulously loyal and ruthless in the collection of taxes. Unlike the era of al-Hajjaj, however, Yazid applied this principle for the first time to Ifriqiya, Khurasan, Sind and the Iberian Peninsula. A major aspect of his policy was the reinstatement of the jizya on the mawālī, which alienated the mawālī in the aforementioned provinces. 

In Ifriqiya, the caliph's governor Yazid ibn Abi Muslim, himself a mawlā from Iraq and a protégé of al-Hajjaj, was assassinated by his Berber guard in 720, shortly after his appointment, for attempting to reinstate the jizya. Many, if not most, Berbers had embraced Islam and commanded a strong position in the army unlike mawālī in other parts of the Caliphate. The Berbers reinstalled Ibn Abi Muslim's predecessor Ismail ibn Abd Allah ibn Abi al-Muhajir and notified Yazid, who approved the change. The incident in Ifriqiya was a blow to the Caliphate's prestige in North Africa and served as a harbinger for the Berber Revolt in 740–743. The reinstatement of the jizya in Khurasan in 721/22 by Ibn Hubayra's deputy Sa'id ibn Amr al-Harashi led to revolts and wars in the province that continued for twenty years and partly contributed to the Abbasid Revolution. In Egypt pay increases to the indigenous mawālī sailors of the Muslim fleet were reversed.

War against the Khazars
In March 722 the Syrian army of Yazid's governor in Armenia and Adharbayjan, Mi'laq ibn Saffar al-Bahrani, was routed by the Khazars in Armenia, south of the Caucasus. The defeat marked the culmination of the Caliphate's winter campaign against the Khazars and resulted in considerable Syrian losses. To avenge this defeat, Yazid II sent al-Jarrah ibn Abdallah at the head of a 25,000-strong army of Syrians, who pushed into the Caucasus homeland of the Khazars and took their capital of Balanjar on 22 August. The main body of the highly mobile Khazars avoided the Muslims' pursuit and their presence compelled al-Jarrah to withdraw to Warthan south of the Caucasus and request reinforcements from Yazid. In 723 he led another raid north of Balanjar, but made no substantive gains.

Iconoclastic edict
According to Greek sources, including Patriarch John V of Jerusalem (d. 735), Theophanes the Confessor (d. 818) and Patriarch Nikephoros I of Constantinople (d. 828), Yazid issued an edict ordering the destruction of all icons in Christian churches across the Caliphate under the influence of a Jewish magician from Tiberias, variously called Beser or Tessarakontapechys, who promised Yazid a long life of fortune in return. Syriac sources further note that Yazid entrusted Maslama to execute the order and that the edict influenced the Byzantine emperor Leo III to enact his own iconoclastic policy in the Byzantine Empire. The Egypt-based Arabic historians al-Kindi (d. 961), Bishop Severus ibn al-Muqaffa (d. 987) and al-Maqrizi (d. 1442) also make note of the edict and describe its execution in Egypt. The medieval historians cite different years for Yazid's edict, but the modern historian Alexander Vasiliev holds that July 721, the date cited by Patriarch John V, is the most reliable. The order was reversed by Caliph Hisham ibn Abd al-Malik.

Death
Yazid died in Irbid in the Balqa (i.e. Transjordan) subdistrict of Jund Dimashq (military district of Damascus) on 26 Sha'ban 105 AH (28 January 724 CE). His son al-Walid or half-brother Hisham led his funeral prayers. Yazid had intended to appoint al-Walid as his immediate successor, but was persuaded by Maslama to appoint Hisham instead, followed by al-Walid.

See also
 Khalid ibn Yazid, maternal uncle of Yazid II.
 Marwan al-Akbar, brother of Yazid II.
 Abd al-Aziz, nephew of Yazid II.

References

Bibliography

690s births
724 deaths
Year of birth uncertain
8th-century Arabs
8th-century rulers in Asia
8th-century rulers in Africa
8th-century rulers in Europe
8th-century Umayyad caliphs
Iconoclasm